"Diary of a Madman" (French: Un Fou) is a short story by French author Guy de Maupassant, published in 1885.

History
The short story was first published in the newspaper Le Gaulois on September 2, 1885, before being reprised in the Monsieur Parent collection.

This short story should not be confused with Un fou ?, published in 1884. The 1885 short story begins with the following words:

Synopsis
As secretary to a judge who is said to be an "honest magistrate whose irreproachable life was talked about in every court in France", a lawyer finds a strange journal.

Publications
 Le Gaulois, 1885
 Monsieur Parent - collection published in 1885 by the editor Paul Ollendorff
 Maupassant, contes et nouvelles, volume II, text established and annotated by Louis Forestier, Bibliothèque de la Pléiade, Éditions Gallimard, 1979

References

External links
 

Short stories by Guy de Maupassant
1885 short stories